Jean Maurice Eugène Clément Cocteau (5 July 1889 – 11 October 1963) was a French poet, playwright, novelist, designer, filmmaker, visual artist and critic. He was one of the foremost creatives of the surrealist, avant-garde, and Dadaist movements; and one of the most influential figures in early 20th-century art as a whole. The National Observer suggested that, “of the artistic generation whose daring gave birth to Twentieth Century Art, Cocteau came closest to being a Renaissance man.”

He is best known for his novels Le Grand Écart (1923), Le Livre blanc (1928), and Les Enfants Terribles (1929); the stage plays La Voix Humaine (1930), La Machine Infernale (1934), Les Parents terribles (1938), La Machine à écrire (1941), and L'Aigle à deux têtes (1946); and the films The Blood of a Poet (1930), Les Parents Terribles (1948), Beauty and the Beast (1946), Orpheus (1950), and Testament of Orpheus (1960), which alongside Blood of a Poet and Orpheus constitute the so-called Orphic Trilogy. He was described as "one of [the] avant-garde's most successful and influential filmmakers" by AllMovie. Cocteau, according to Annette Insdorf, “left behind a body of work unequalled for its variety of artistic expression.”

Though his body of work encompassed many different mediums, Cocteau insisted on calling himself a poet, classifying the great variety of his works – poems, novels, plays, essays, drawings, films – as "poésie", "poésie de roman", "poésie de thêatre", "poésie critique", "poésie graphique" and "poésie cinématographique".

Biography

Early life
Cocteau was born in Maisons-Laffitte, Yvelines, a town near Paris, to Georges Cocteau and his wife, Eugénie Lecomte: a socially prominent Parisian family. His father, a lawyer and amateur painter, committed suicide when Cocteau was nine. From 1900 to 1904, Cocteau attended the Lycée Condorcet where he met and began a relationship with schoolmate Pierre Dargelos, who would reappear throughout Cocteau's work, "John Cocteau: Erotic Drawings." He left home at fifteen. He published his first volume of poems, Aladdin's Lamp, at nineteen. Cocteau soon became known in Bohemian artistic circles as The Frivolous Prince, the title of a volume he published at twenty-two. Edith Wharton described him as a man "to whom every great line of poetry was a sunrise, every sunset the foundation of the Heavenly City..."

Early career

In his early twenties, Cocteau became associated with the writers Marcel Proust, André Gide, and Maurice Barrès. In 1912, he collaborated with Léon Bakst on Le Dieu bleu for the Ballets Russes; the principal dancers being Tamara Karsavina and Vaslav Nijinsky. During World War I, Cocteau served in the Red Cross as an ambulance driver. This was the period in which he met the poet Guillaume Apollinaire, artists Pablo Picasso and Amedeo Modigliani, and numerous other writers and artists with whom he later collaborated. Russian impresario Sergei Diaghilev persuaded Cocteau to write a scenario for a ballet, which resulted in Parade in 1917. It was produced by Diaghilev, with sets by Picasso, the libretto by Apollinaire and the music by Erik Satie. "If it had not been for Apollinaire in uniform," wrote Cocteau, "with his skull shaved, the scar on his temple and the bandage around his head, women would have gouged our eyes out with hairpins."

An important exponent of avant-garde art, Cocteau had great influence on the work of others, including a group of composers known as Les six. In the early twenties, he and other members of Les six frequented a wildly popular bar named Le Boeuf sur le Toit, a name that Cocteau himself had a hand in picking. The popularity was due in no small measure to the presence of Cocteau and his friends.

Friendship with Raymond Radiguet

In 1918 he met the French poet Raymond Radiguet. They collaborated extensively, socialized, and undertook many journeys and vacations together. Cocteau also got Radiguet exempted from military service. Admiring of Radiguet's great literary talent, Cocteau promoted his friend's works in his artistic circle and arranged for the publication by Grasset of Le Diable au corps (a largely autobiographical story of an adulterous relationship between a married woman and a younger man), exerting his influence to have the novel awarded the "Nouveau Monde" literary prize. Some contemporaries and later commentators thought there might have been a romantic component to their friendship. Cocteau himself was aware of this perception, and worked earnestly to dispel the notion that their relationship was sexual in nature.

There is disagreement over Cocteau's reaction to Radiguet's sudden death in 1923, with some claiming that it left him stunned, despondent and prey to opium addiction. Opponents of that interpretation point out that he did not attend the funeral (he generally did not attend funerals) and immediately left Paris with Diaghilev for a performance of Les noces (The Wedding) by the Ballets Russes at Monte Carlo. Cocteau himself much later characterised his reaction as one of "stupor and disgust." His opium addiction at the time, Cocteau said, was only coincidental, due to a chance meeting with Louis Laloy, the administrator of the Monte Carlo Opera. Cocteau's opium use and his efforts to stop profoundly changed his literary style. His most notable book, Les Enfants Terribles, was written in a week during a strenuous opium weaning. In , he recounts the experience of his recovery from opium addiction in 1929. His account, which includes vivid pen-and-ink illustrations, alternates between his moment-to-moment experiences of drug withdrawal and his current thoughts about people and events in his world. Cocteau was supported throughout his recovery by his friend and correspondent, Catholic philosopher Jacques Maritain. Under Maritain's influence Cocteau made a temporary return to the sacraments of the Catholic Church. He again returned to the Church later in life and undertook a number of religious art projects.

Further works
On 15 June 1926 Cocteau's play Orphée was staged in Paris. It was quickly followed by an exhibition of drawings and "constructions" called Poésie plastique–objets, dessins. Cocteau wrote the libretto for Igor Stravinsky's opera-oratorio Oedipus rex, which had its original performance in the Théâtre Sarah Bernhardt in Paris on 30 May 1927. In 1929 one of his most celebrated and well known works, the novel Les Enfants terribles was published.

In 1930 Cocteau made his first film The Blood of a Poet, publicly shown in 1932. Though now generally accepted as a surrealist film, the surrealists themselves did not accept it as a truly surrealist work. Although this is one of Cocteau's best known works, his 1930s are notable rather for a number of stage plays, above all La Voix humaine and Les Parents terribles, which was a popular success. His 1934 play La Machine infernale was Cocteau's stage version of the Oedipus legend and is considered to be his greatest work for the theater. During this period Cocteau also published two volumes of journalism, including Mon Premier Voyage: Tour du Monde en 80 jours, a neo-Jules Verne around the world travel reportage he made for the newspaper Paris-Soir.

1940–1944

Throughout his life, Cocteau tried to maintain a distance from political movements, confessing to a friend that "my politics are non-existent." According to Claude Arnaud, from the 1920s on, Cocteau's only deeply held political convictions were a marked pacifism and antiracism. He praised the French republic for serving as a haven for the persecuted, and applauded Picasso's anti-war painting Guernica as a cross that "Franco would always carry on his shoulder." In 1940, Cocteau signed a petition circulated by the Ligue internationale contre l'antisémitisme which protested the rise of racism and antisemitism in France, and declared himself "ashamed of his white skin" after witnessing the plight of colonized peoples during his travels.

Although in 1938 Cocteau had compared Adolf Hitler to an evil demiurge who wished to perpetrate a Saint Bartholomew's Day massacre against Jews, his friend Arno Breker convinced him that Hitler was a pacifist and patron of the arts with France's best interests in mind. During the Nazi occupation of France, he was in a "round-table" of French and German intellectuals who met at the Georges V Hotel in Paris, including Cocteau, the writers Ernst Jünger, Paul Morand and Henry Millon de Montherlant, the publisher Gaston Gallimard and the Nazi legal scholar Carl Schmitt. In his diary, Cocteau accused France of disrespect towards Hitler and speculated on the Führer's sexuality. Cocteau effusively praised Breker's sculptures in an article entitled 'Salut à Breker' published in 1942. This piece caused him to be arraigned on charges of collaboration after the war, though he was cleared of any wrongdoing and had used his contacts to his failed attempt to save friends such as Max Jacob. Later, after growing closer with communists such as Louis Aragon, Cocteau would name Joseph Stalin as "the only great politician of the era."

In 1940, Le Bel Indifférent, Cocteau's play written for and starring Édith Piaf (who died the day before Cocteau), was enormously successful.

Later years
Cocteau's later years are mostly associated with his films. Cocteau's films, most of which he both wrote and directed, were particularly important in introducing the avant-garde into French cinema and influenced to a certain degree the upcoming French New Wave genre.

Following The Blood of a Poet (1930), his best known films include Beauty and the Beast (1946), Les Parents terribles (1948), and Orpheus (1949). His final film, Le Testament d'Orphée (The Testament of Orpheus) (1960), featured appearances by Picasso and matador Luis Miguel Dominguín, along with Yul Brynner, who also helped finance the film.

In 1945 Cocteau was one of several designers who created sets for the Théâtre de la Mode. He drew inspiration from filmmaker René Clair while making Tribute to René Clair: I Married a Witch. The maquette is described in his "Journal 1942–1945," in his entry for 12 February 1945: 

In 1956 Cocteau decorated the Chapelle Saint-Pierre in Villefranche-sur-Mer with mural paintings. The following year he also decorated the marriage hall at the Hôtel de Ville in Menton.

Private life
Jean Cocteau never hid his homosexuality. He was the author of the mildly homoerotic and semi-autobiographical Le Livre blanc (translated as The White Paper or The White Book), published anonymously in 1928. He never repudiated its authorship and a later edition of the novel features his foreword and drawings. The novel begins:

Frequently his work, either literary (Les enfants terribles), graphic (erotic drawings, book illustration, paintings) or cinematographic (The Blood of a Poet, Orpheus, Beauty and the Beast), is pervaded with homosexual undertones, homoerotic imagery/symbolism or camp. In 1947 Paul Morihien published a clandestine edition of Querelle de Brest by Jean Genet, featuring 29 very explicit erotic drawings by Cocteau. In recent years several albums of Cocteau's homoerotica have been available to the general public.

It is widely believed that Cocteau had affairs with Raymond Radiguet, Jean Desbordes, Marcel Khill, and Panama Al Brown.

In the 1930s, Cocteau is rumoured to have had a very brief affair with Princess Natalie Paley, the daughter of a Romanov Grand Duke and herself a sometime actress, model, and former wife of couturier Lucien Lelong.

Cocteau's longest-lasting relationships were with French actors Jean Marais and Édouard Dermit, whom Cocteau formally adopted. Cocteau cast Marais in The Eternal Return (1943), Beauty and the Beast (1946), Ruy Blas (1947), and Orpheus (1949).

Death
Cocteau died of a heart attack at his château in Milly-la-Forêt, Essonne, France, on 11 October 1963 at the age of 74. His friend, French singer Édith Piaf, died the day before but that was announced on the morning of Cocteau's day of death; it has been said, in a story which is almost certainly apocryphal, that his heart failed upon hearing of Piaf's death. Cocteau's health had already been in decline for several months, and he had previously had a severe heart attack on 22 April 1963. A more plausible suggestion for the reason behind this decline in health has been proposed by author Roger Peyrefitte, who notes that Cocteau had been devastated by a breach with his longtime friend, socialite and notable patron Francine Weisweiller, as a result of an affair she had been having with a minor writer. Weisweiller and Cocteau did not reconcile until shortly before Cocteau's death.

According to his wishes Cocteau is buried beneath the floor of the Chapelle Saint-Blaise des Simples in Milly-la-Forêt. The epitaph on his gravestone set in the floor of the chapel reads: "I stay with you" ("Je reste avec vous").

Honours and awards
In 1955, Cocteau was made a member of the Académie Française and The Royal Academy of Belgium.

During his life, Cocteau was commander of the Legion of Honor, Member of the Mallarmé Academy, German Academy (Berlin), American Academy, Mark Twain (U.S.A) Academy, Honorary President of the Cannes Film Festival, Honorary President of the France-Hungary Association and President of the Jazz Academy and of the Academy of the Disc.

Filmography

Works

Literature

Poetry

Novels

Theatre

Poetry and criticism

Journalistic poetry

Film

Director

Scriptwriter

Dialogue writer

Director of Photography

Artworks

Recordings
 Colette par Jean Cocteau, discours de réception à l'Académie Royale de Belgique, Ducretet-Thomson 300 V 078 St.
 Les Mariés de la Tour Eiffel and Portraits-Souvenir, La Voix de l'Auteur LVA 13
 Plain-chant by Jean Marais, extracts from the piece Orphée by Jean-Pierre Aumont, Michel Bouquet, Monique Mélinand, Les Parents terribles by Yvonne de Bray and Jean Marais, L'Aigle à deux têtes par Edwige Feuillère and Jean Marais, L'Encyclopédie Sonore 320 E 874, 1971
 Collection of three vinyl recordings of Jean Cocteau including La Voix humaine by Simone Signoret, 18 songs composed by Louis Bessières, Bee Michelin and Renaud Marx, on double-piano Paul Castanier, Le Discours de réception à l'Académie française, Jacques Canetti JC1, 1984
 Derniers propos à bâtons rompus avec Jean Cocteau, 16 September 1963 à Milly-la-Forêt, Bel Air 311035
 Les Enfants terribles, radio version with Jean Marais, Josette Day, Silvia Monfort and Jean Cocteau, CD Phonurgia Nova , 1992
 Anthology, 4 CD containing numerous poems and texts read by the author, Anna la bonne, La Dame de Monte-Carlo and Mes sœurs, n'aimez pas les marins by Marianne Oswald, Le Bel Indifférent by Edith Piaf, La Voix humaine by Berthe Bovy, Les Mariés de la Tour Eiffel with Jean Le Poulain, Jacques Charon and Jean Cocteau, discourse on the reception at the Académie française, with extracts from Les Parents terribles, La Machine infernale, pieces from Parade on piano with two hands by Georges Auric and Francis Poulenc, Frémeaux & Associés FA 064, 1997
 Poems by Jean Cocteau read by the author, CD EMI 8551082, 1997
 Hommage à Jean Cocteau, mélodies d'Henri Sauguet, Arthur Honegger, Louis Durey, Darius Milhaud, Erik Satie, Jean Wiener, Max Jacob, Francis Poulenc, Maurice Delage, Georges Auric, Guy Sacre, by Jean-François Gardeil (baritone) and Billy Eidi (piano), CD Adda 581177, 1989
 Le Testament d'Orphée, journal sonore, by Roger Pillaudin, 2 CD INA / Radio France 211788, 1998

Journals

Stamps
1960: Marianne de Cocteau

See also

Jean Cocteau Repertory
List of ambulance drivers during World War I

Footnotes

References
Breton, André (1953). La Clé des champs, p. 77. Paris: Éditions du Sagittaire.Crucifixion translated into Bengali by Malay Roy Choudhury
Steegmuller, Francis (1970). Cocteau: A Biography. Boston: Atlantic-Little Brown & Company. .

Further reading
Evans, Arthur B. (1977). Jean Cocteau and his Films of Orphic Identity. Philadelphia: Art Alliance Press. .
Peters, Arthur King. (1986) Jean Cocteau and His World. New York: Vendôme Press. 
Tsakiridou, Cornelia A., ed. (1997). Reviewing Orpheus: Essays on the Cinema and Art of Jean Cocteau. Lewisburg, Pa.: Bucknell University Press. .
 Album Cocteau. Biographie et iconographie de Pierre Bergé. Bibliothèque de la Pléiade. Éditions Gallimard, 2006. .

External links

 Jean Cocteau Papers at the Harry Ransom Center
 
 
 
 
 
 Jean Cocteau short Biography
 Cocteau/cinema Bibliography (via UC Berkeley)
 
 Cocteau CMEF Cap d'Ail
 Cocteau et La chapelle Saint-Blaise-des-Simples
 Raquel Bitton: The Sparrow and the Birdman'', a drama focusing on the relationship of Cocteau to Edith Piaf
 
 Maison Jean Cocteau – Cocteau's former home

 
1889 births
1963 deaths
People from Maisons-Laffitte
Lycée Condorcet alumni
French ballet librettists
20th-century French dramatists and playwrights
French experimental filmmakers
French fantasy writers
French film directors
French illustrators
French novelists
20th-century French painters
20th-century male artists
French male painters
French poets
French male screenwriters
French screenwriters
Writers from Île-de-France
Prince des poètes
Christian poets
Christian novelists
Les Six
French gay writers
LGBT film directors
French LGBT screenwriters
LGBT Roman Catholics
Surrealist filmmakers
French surrealist artists
French stamp designers
French Roman Catholics
Members of the Académie Française
Members of the Académie royale de langue et de littérature françaises de Belgique
Commandeurs of the Légion d'honneur
French LGBT dramatists and playwrights
French LGBT poets
French LGBT novelists
Painters of the Return to Order
20th-century French screenwriters